Sideridis maryx the maroonwing moth, is a species of moth native to North America. In the US state of Connecticut, it is listed as a species of special concern and is believed to be extirpated. The larval food plant is unknown, but it is suspected to be a specialist feeding on Arctostaphylos uva-ursi. The species was first described by Achille Guenée in 1852.

References

Hadeninae
Moths of North America
Moths described in 1852